Chloephaga is a genus of sheldgeese in the family Anatidae. Other sheldgeese are found in the genera Alopochen and Neochen.

Taxonomy 
The genus Chloephaga was introduced in 1838 by the English naturalist Thomas Campbell Eyton in his A Monograph on the Anatidae, or Duck Tribe. He designated the type species as Chloephaga magellanica. This is Anas magellanica Gmelin, JF 1789, which is a synonym of Anas leucoptera Gmelin, JF 1789. Anas leucoptera is now considered as a subspecies of the upland goose Chloephaga picta leucoptera.  The genus name comes from the combination of the Ancient Greek khloē meaning "grass" with -phagos meaning "-eating".

A molecular phylogenetic study by Mariana Bulgarella and collaborators published in 2014 found that the Orinoco goose in the monotypic genus Neochem, was embedded in the genus Chloephaga:

Based on this result, some authorities place the Orinoco goose together with the Andean goose in the resurrected genus Oressochen.

A fossilized partial coracoid (CTES-PZ 7797) of an indeterminate Chloephaga species sharing some characters with the extant upland goose is known from the upper Pleistocene Toropí Formation (also called the Yupoí Formation) in Corrientes Province, Argentina, 700 kilometers further north than the northernmost present-day record of the genus.

Species
The genus contains five species.

See also
 List of extinct bird species since 1500
 List of Late Quaternary prehistoric bird species
 List of fossil bird genera

References

External links

Geese
Taxa named by Thomas Campbell Eyton